ILA or Ila may refer to:

Places
 Ila, Georgia, a community in United States
 Ila, Osun, a local government area in Nigeria
 Ila, Trondheim, a neighborhood of Trondheim, Norway
 Ila (station), a Trondheim Tramway station
 Islay (Scots: Ila), an island of Scotland

People
 Ila Loetscher (1904–2000), aviational pioneer and turtle explorer
 Ila Arun (born 1954), popular Indian actress, TV personality and Rajasthani folk/folk-pop singer
 Ila Mitra (1925–2002), born Ila Sen, social reformer of Indian subcontinent
 Ila Borders (born 1975), professional baseball player, United States
 Ila Lóth (1900–1975), Hungarian film actress
 Ila Ray Hadley (1942–1961), American figure skater
 Ila Pant (born 1938), Indian politician and a former Member of Parliament
 Ila Patnaik, Indian economist and Principal Economic Advisor to the Indian Govt
 Ila Mae McAfee (1900–1996), American painter, muralist, illustrator and author
 Ila Arab Mehta (born 1938), Gujarati novelist and story writer

Fictional or mythical entities
 Ila, a minor character in the television series Battlestar Galactica
 Ila (Hinduism), daughter of saint Manu
 Ila (Samoan mythology), the first woman on Tutuila (American Samoa), in Polynesian mythology

Government
 Ila Detention and Security Prison, a prison in Bærum, Norway
 Israel Land Administration
 Israel Land Authority, the successor agency to the Israel Land Administration

Organizations
 Idaho Library Association
 Illinois Library Association
 Indian Laser Association
 Indian Library Association
 Institute of Landscape Architects, in UK
 Institute for Legislative Action (NRA-ILA), political lobbying arm of the National Rifle Association of America
 International Law Association
 International Linguistic Association
 International Longevity Alliance
 International Longshoremen's Association, North American labor union
 Iowa Library Association

Technology
 In-line light amplifier, optical amplifier

Other uses
 Caol Ila, whisky made in Islay, Scotland
 Ila birthmark, the birthmark ila
 Ila people, an ethnic group in Zambia
 Ila language (ISO 639 language code: ilb), spoken by the Ila people
 Ile Ape language (ISO 639 language code: ila)
 Individual Learning Account, tax incentives for adult education in the UK
 Internationale Luft- und Raumfahrtausstellung or ILA Berlin Air Show, annual German aerospace exhibition
 MV Ila, ship in service 1947–52

See also

 
 
 
 ILAS (disambiguation)
 Island (disambiguation)
 Isla (disambiguation)
 Isle (disambiguation)
 Ile (disambiguation)
 2ILA, an Australian radio station